Donald Augustine Rogers (April 22, 1928 - October 24, 2018) was an American politician in the state of California. He served in the California State Assembly as a Republican for the 33rd district from 1979 to 1986 and in the State Senate for the 16th and 17th district from 1986 to 1996.

References

1928 births
2018 deaths
California Republicans
Politicians from Natchitoches, Louisiana
Politicians from Bakersfield, California
20th-century American politicians
Louisiana State University alumni